Sophie Katinis (born 31 January 1979), also known as Sophie Roche, is an Australian actress, singer and voice-over who has appeared in many television and theatre roles.

Television
Sophie played the role of university student Mel Bennett on the drama headLand in 2006. This led to a starring role as personal assistant Tina Carmody in the comedy series Stupid, Stupid Man followed by the role of Gabby West in the BBC Television commissioned Australian soap opera, Out of the Blue. In 2010, she had a guest role in Packed to the Rafters and joined Home and Away as Veronica. Sophie was also the puppeteer and voice actress for Chatterbox in Hi-5 (Series 5 with replay episodes for Series 6, hosted by original member Kellie Crawford (née Hoggart)).

Sophie has also appeared in many Australian television commercials including a well known role as "Amy", the pushy girlfriend in television advertisements for insurer AAMI.

Theatre
Sophie played the role of "Ellen" in the 2007 Australian production of Miss Saigon.

References

External links 

1979 births
Living people
Australian people of Greek descent
Australian stage actresses
Australian television actresses
Australian voice actresses